Art & Gadg is an original radio play by Gregory Evans about the relationship between Arthur Miller (Art) and Elia Kazan (Gadg short for gadget, a nickname of Kazan). The 45-minute play was first transmitted on BBC Radio 4 15 January 2013. It was directed by Marc Beeby.

Synopsis
After 10 years of estrangement, Arthur Miller and Elia Kazan, two giants of American theatre, are forced to confront their intense, almost brotherly friendship - and how that friendship was destroyed by the great moral and political dilemma of the time.

Cast
Nathan Osgood as Arthur Miller
Karl Johnson as Elia Kazan 
Fenella Woolgaras Barbara Loden.

References

External links
BBC: Art & Gadg page

British radio dramas
Plays based on real people